George Suckley (1830–1869) was an American physician and naturalist notable as an explorer of the Washington and Oregon territories in the 1850s, and describer of several new fish species.

Life
He was born in New York City, studied at the College of Physicians and Surgeons (today Columbia University), received an M.D. in 1851, and subsequently served as surgeon at New York Hospital.

In April 1853 Suckley was appointed assistant surgeon and naturalist to the Pacific Railroad Survey led by Isaac Stevens. Initially commissioned as a surgeon with the U.S. Army, Suckley resigned in 1856 to pursue natural history full-time resulting in the publication of several works on the natural history of the Pacific Northwest.

Upon the outbreak of the American Civil War, Suckley rejoined the Army and worked as a surgeon throughout the war. He died in New York City a few years after the war.

Two fish species, Squalus suckleyi Girard 1855, and Catostomus sucklii Girard 1856, and the bumblebee Bombus suckleyi are named after George Suckley.

In 1856, American botanist A.Gray published Suckleya, a genus of flowering plants from America belonging to the family Amaranthaceae, which were named in George Suckley's honor.

Works
 (with James Graham Cooper) Natural History of Washington Territory (1859)

References

External links

 Smithsonian page on Suckley
 Smithsonian page on Suckley
George Suckley Papers, 1849-1861 from the Smithsonian Institution Archives

1830 births
1869 deaths
Union Army surgeons
American ichthyologists